Wade Nelson Hamilton (born September 15, 1994) is an American soccer goalkeeper who last played for LA Galaxy II in the United Soccer League.

Career

College and amateur
Hamilton spent his entire college career at Cal Poly University between 2012 and 2015. In 2015, he was named Big West Goalkeeper of the Year and First Team All-Big West Conference.

He also played in the Premier Development League for Lane United FC.

Professional
On January 19, 2016, Hamilton was selected in the third round (61st overall) of the 2016 MLS SuperDraft by Portland Timbers.

References

External links

1994 births
Living people
American soccer players
Association football goalkeepers
Cal Poly Mustangs men's soccer players
Lane United FC players
People from Murrieta, California
Portland Timbers draft picks
Portland Timbers players
Portland Timbers 2 players
Soccer players from California
Sportspeople from Riverside County, California
USL Championship players
USL League Two players